Vigori Jean-Jaurès Gbe (born 20 February 2002) is an Ivorian professional footballer who plays as a right-back for FC Haka.

Club career
Gbe started his career playing for Williamsville and featured for them in the 2018 CAF Confederation Cup. In February 2021, he signed for Veikkausliiga club Ilves on a one-year deal, with the option of an additional year. Later that month, he made his debut, coming on as a substitute in a 2–1 loss to Oulu in the Suomen Cup. On 4 January 2022, Gbe joined fellow Veikkausliiga club FC Haka on a one-year deal with an option to extend by a further year.

International career
Gbe has represented Ivory Coast at under-23 level.

Personal life
Gbe was born in Man, Ivory Coast and started playing football at the age of 8. His favorite player is Dani Carvajal.

References

Living people
2002 births
Ivorian footballers
Association football fullbacks
Ivory Coast youth international footballers
People from Man, Ivory Coast
Williamsville Athletic Club players
Ligue 1 (Ivory Coast) players
Ilves players
FC Haka players
Veikkausliiga players
Kakkonen players
Ivorian expatriate footballers
Ivorian expatriate sportspeople in Finland
Expatriate footballers in Finland